EHF Players of the Month are monthly handball awards which recognises the best male and female players from European Handball Federation competitions. The recipients are chosen by a panel of journalists assembled by the EHF Media department, and are announced on the first Thursday of the following month.

The awards were launched in January 2016 and are given on a monthly basis, except for of July and August when the months are combined to allow both male and female younger age category competitions to take place.

Any player who has taken part in an EHF competition, including the EHF Champions League, EHF Cup, EHF Challenge Cup, EHF EURO, European Beach Handball Championship (disambiguation) and all European Younger Age Category events, is eligible to be nominated for the award.

Out of all the monthly winners are picked the EHF Players of the Year.

Male winners

Titles by players

Titles by clubs

Titles by country

Female winners

See also
 EHF Players of the Year

References

European Handball Federation
Handball trophies and awards